Halcampulactidae is a family of sea anemones belonging to the order Actiniaria.

Genera:
 Halcampulactis Gusmão, Berniker, Van Deusen, Harris & Rodríguez, 2019

References

Actinostoloidea
Cnidarian families